Young-soo, also spelled Young-su or Yeong-su, is a Korean unisex given name. Its meaning depends on the hanja used to write each syllable of the name. There are 34 hanja with the reading "young" and 67 hanja with the reading "soo" on the South Korean government's official list of hanja which may be registered for use in given names. It was the second-most popular name for newborn boys in South Korea in 1960; this was part of a broader trend of giving boys names starting with the element "young" in the 1940s through the 1960s.

People with this name include:
Kim Eung-hwan (1742–1789), courtesy name Yeongsu, Joseon Dynasty painter
O Yeong-su (1909–1979), South Korean writer
Yuk Young-soo (1925–1974), wife of South Korean dictator Park Chung-hee
John Choi Young-su (1942–2009), South Korean Archbishop of the Roman Catholic Archdiocese of Daegu
Yun Young-su (born 1952), South Korean female writer
Chun Young-soo (born 1963), South Korean football player
An Young-su (born 1964), South Korean amateur boxer
YoungSoo Kim (born 1978), South Korean chemist
Im Yong-su (born 1980), North Korean weightlifter
Bae Young-soo (born 1981), South Korean baseball pitcher (Korea Baseball Organization)
Shin Young-soo (born 1982), South Korean volleyball player

See also
List of Korean given names

References

Korean unisex given names